Famine in Sudan may refer to:

 1993 Sudan famine, during civil war and political unrest
 1998 Sudan famine, caused mainly by human rights abuses and drought
 2017 South Sudan famine, following years of food supply instability caused by war and drought